In geometry, the order-6 apeirogonal tiling is a regular tiling of the hyperbolic plane. It has Schläfli symbol of {∞,6}.

Symmetry
The dual to this tiling represents the fundamental domains of [∞,6*] symmetry, orbifold notation *∞∞∞∞∞∞ symmetry, a hexagonal domain with five ideal vertices. 
 

The order-6 apeirogonal tiling can be uniformly colored with 6 colored apeirogons around each vertex, and coxeter diagram: , except ultraparallel branches on the diagonals.

Related polyhedra and tiling 

This tiling is also topologically related as a part of sequence of regular polyhedra and tilings with six faces per vertex, starting with the triangular tiling, with Schläfli symbol {n,6}, and Coxeter diagram , with n progressing to infinity.

See also

Tilings of regular polygons
List of uniform planar tilings
List of regular polytopes

References
 John H. Conway, Heidi Burgiel, Chaim Goodman-Strauss, The Symmetries of Things 2008,  (Chapter 19, The Hyperbolic Archimedean Tessellations)

External links 

 Hyperbolic and Spherical Tiling Gallery
 KaleidoTile 3: Educational software to create spherical, planar and hyperbolic tilings
 Hyperbolic Planar Tessellations, Don Hatch

Apeirogonal tilings
Hyperbolic tilings
Isogonal tilings
Isohedral tilings
Order-6 tilings
Regular tilings